Lucien Leopold Harrigan (January 8, 1942 – August 18, 2007), known professionally as Jon Lucien, was a singer from Tortola in the British Virgin Islands. His parents were Eric "Rico" Lucien Harrigan and Eloise Turnbull Harrigan of Tortolan families. His father was a musician whose main instrument was a three-coursed Latin guitar-like chordophone known as a Tres.

Life and career
Born in Tortola in 1942, Lucien was raised in St. Thomas. As a teenager, he played bass in his father's band. During the 1960s he moved to New York City. While performing at a party, he was discovered by an executive from RCA, which released his debut album (I Am Now, 1970) of pop and jazz standards. Lucien said the label attempted to market him as a "black Sinatra". His second album, Rashida, contained only songs written by Lucien, with "Lady Love" receiving radio airplay. Dave Grusin received a Grammy Award nomination for his arrangements. He recorded two albums for Columbia before making guest appearances on Yesterday's Dreams by Alphonso Johnson and Mr. Gone by Weather Report.

His daughter drowned in 1980, and he spent much of the decade struggling with drug addiction. He returned to music with the albums Listen Love (Mercury, 1991) and Mother Nature's Son (Mercury, 1993). Another daughter died tragically, in the crash of TWA Flight 800, and Lucien dedicated his album Endless Love (1997) to her.

He died of respiratory failure in Orlando, Florida, on August 18, 2007.

Discography
 I Am Now (RCA, 1970)
 Rashida (RCA, 1973)
 Mind's Eye (RCA, 1974)
 Song for My Lady (Columbia, 1975)
 Premonition (Columbia, 1976)
 Romantico (Precision, 1980)
 Inside Moves as featured vocalist (Elektra Records,1984)
 Listen Love (Mercury, 1991)
 Mother Nature's Son (Mercury, 1993)
 Endless Is Love (Shanachie, 1997)
 By Request (Shanachie, 1999)
 Precious Is Love (Love Arts, 1999)
 Man from Paradise (Sugar Apple Music, 2002)
 Live in NYC (Sugar Apple Music, 2003)
 A Time for Love (Sugar Apple Music, 2004)
 The Wayfarer (Sugar Apple Music, 2008)

References

Further reading
Notable Caribbeans and Caribbean Americans: A Biographical Dictionary, by Serafín Méndez-Méndez and Gail A. Cueto. Greenwood Press, 2003.

External links
 Jon Lucien Dies at age 65
 John Lucien Page
 Jazz Singer Jon Lucien Dies At 65, Baritone Was Known For Soulful, Sultry Ballads - The ShowBuzz

1942 births
2007 deaths
People from Saint Thomas, U.S. Virgin Islands
20th-century American singers
20th-century British musicians
American jazz singers
British Virgin Islands emigrants to the United States
British Virgin Islands musicians
British Virgin Islands singers
Soul-jazz vocalists
United States Virgin Islands musicians
GRP Records artists
People from Tortola